Sunday league football in England consists of a series of leagues of amateur football clubs that play matches on Sundays. Most Sunday leagues across England consist of multiple divisions including promotion and relegation, but are not part of the English football league system. Every Sunday League operates under the jurisdiction of the local county association. Since 1964, all the Sunday Leagues (adult, junior and youth) have been under the auspices of the Football Association and their clubs are eligible to compete in the FA Sunday Cup and the local county cups.

History

Beginnings
The idea mainly started among young unemployed men in the 1920s in the Greater London area, with kick-abouts taking place in open spaces on Sunday afternoon. Soon, the first matches were organised but under difficult conditions for the players and the clubs: there were no changing rooms, no nets or corner flags and pitch markings. In the early 1930s a large percentage of workers were brought in London from Ireland, Manchester and Wales and these new immigrants formed their own Sunday football clubs.The first Sunday League to be formed in England was the Edmonton & District Sunday Football League of North London in 1925. The East London Sunday League followed in 1930, the Metropolitan Sunday League in 1934, the West Fulham in 1936 and the Essex Corinthian in 1937.Despite the fact that businessmen helped the clubs financially the new Leagues could not affiliate to the local County Football Association. Sunday league football was not recognised by any County FA and footballers who were under contract by a Saturday side or referees had to play under assumed names or risk being suspended.

FA's hostile stance
Sunday leisure and entertainment activities had long been constrained by successive Sunday Observance Acts which also prohibited
the charging for admission to such events. Additionally, in the religious areas of society it was considered unacceptable to partake in such activities on a Sunday, which was deemed a "day of rest". However, for those fans that worked on Saturdays and supported their local teams later in the day, Sundays were the only days  to play football.The Football Association went along with the traditional view and would refuse to officially recognise Sunday football, and thus place restrictions on it. However, many players and officials used false names when participating on a Sunday. In August 1939 the FA finally decided to appoint a Sub-Committee to review the situation and potentially recognise Sunday league football, but the World War II intervened.

Post war
With the parks being turned into anti-aircraft gun sites and with most young people becoming involved in the war effort and going into the services, very little football was played. On 24 September 1943 the Sub-Committee members were actually appointed and of these was Edward "Teddy" Eden, the F.A. Councillor for Birmingham, who was to spend the next 17 years persuading other F.A. Councillors to recognise Sunday football.
After end of the World War II football activities were resumed and Sunday league football attracted interest again with more London leagues being founded: the Southern Sunday League in 1944, Hackney and Leyton, and Hampstead & District (later renamed to Camden Sunday League) in 1947, Wandsworth and District in 1949 with most matches played at Hackney Marshes. In 1947 the Manchester Amateur Sunday League became the first one to start outside the area of Greater London, while the FA via its Sub-Committee had already made a few recommendations Sunday football restrictions since October 1945. When those recommendations were reviewed in July 1946 it was decided that no changes in the restrictions against Sunday football would be made.Despite that, large crowds with an attendance of 300 to 400 very common in mid 1940s. Nearly every pub in London used to have and sponsor a football team, while other teams were funded by working men's clubs. Another reason for the creation of Sunday teams was the fact that many amateur football players had work commitments on a Saturday and they could only play football on Sundays. Sunday football's popularity rose rapidly in the 1950s with many more leagues starting to form around England: the Watford Sunday League was founded in 1955, the South Birmingham Sunday League in 1957, the Wolverhampton & District in 1958 and the Middleton & District in 1959.The Football Association saw this development as a threat to the legitimate Saturday football. But, by the late 1950s several Sunday leagues were getting unofficially recognised by the local County Associations. One of the first leagues was the Essex Sunday league which was unofficially recognised by the Essex County FA in 1955. Moreover, many young talents of the time would start of their careers playing Sunday league football and Jimmy Greaves and Bobby Moore were among them before joining amateur or professional youth sides.In 1959 the FA announced that any players or referees participating in the Sunday leagues would be banned from the official Saturday football, after noticing that many professionals - including England's and Wolves' outside left, Jimmy Mullen were also playing Sunday league football.Nevertheless, that announcement resulted in the creation of a national knock-out competition by the Sunday league Committees, the Sunday Cup between teams from the various Sunday leagues in 1960 and soon after the FA  changed its policy and allowed Sunday leagues to become affiliated to County Associations.

The creation of the national Sunday Cup
 
The big step that the Committees of the various Sunday leagues across England took was the launch of a national cup competition in the 1960-61 season, similar to the FA Amateur Cup which had commenced in 1893. The inaugural final saw Walsall Waflers from the Lichfield & Walsall Sunday league facing the Stamford Rovers of the Grantham & District. Forest Gate Mount Athletic from the Essex Sunday Corinthian Sunday League won the next 3 finals until 1964 when The Football Association persuaded by Teddy Eden who had become the Chairman of the Committee decided to sanction the competition and rename it to FA Sunday Cup.The format under the FA's jurisdiction would change in the 1964-65 season with a new trophy presented to the F.A. by Mohammad Reza Pahlavi, the King of Iran was allocated to this new revamped competition which was held on a County basis. Counties could enter either a
representative XI league side or nominate one of their clubs to represent them. Only London used a nominated club, the Summerstown Athletic from Wimbledon. At the end 16 counties entered the new competition, with London (Summerstown Athletic) being crowned the winners against Hertfordshire (3-0).

The rise in the 1960s
After the FA allowed all Sunday leagues to be affiliated to the County Associations, there was a rapid increase in the creation of more leagues. Burton & District was founded in 1964, Gloucester & District and the Tameside Sunday League in 1965, Barnet & District, Coventry & District, Bletchley & District, Leamington & District, Nuneaton & District, Sutton & District in 1966, Cheltenham Sunday League and Hyde & District in 1968 etc. That unprecedented boom was also coupled up with England winning the FIFA World Cup in the summer of 1966. A few months earlier, on 26 January 1966, Teddy Eden, died, aged 86, just two days after presiding at what was to be his final Sunday Football committee meeting.

The 1980s
Amateur players continued to also feature in the Sunday league. On several occasions key players for amateur sides picked up injuries sustained whilst playing Sunday league football and many senior Saturday clubs not only followed suit against the Sunday League, but also encouraged their players to sign professional forms. Such a development would automatically exclude them from playing Sunday league football and it meant that several Sunday League clubs would lose their quality players. The majority of those amateur players eventually signed professional forms and that had a domino effect on some of the smaller Sunday sides of that time, all over the country.

The importance of Hackney Marshes
The Hackney Marshes pitch complex was formed in 1946 with some rubble from the Blitz used as part of the sub-surface. The Marshes located in Stratford, East London were divided into north, south, east and west, and at its peak in the 1950s and 60s there were 120 full-size pitches bringing over 2,500 local footballers down to the area every Sunday morning. The number of football pitches was down to 106 by 1990 and the hosting of the 2012 Summer Olympics by London meant that 12 pitches were converted to a car park. There are 88 left today, of which 60 are described as full-size adult pitches.In 2010 Lionel Messi had expressed the desire to play at the Hackney Marshes and he flew into the spiritual home of English Sunday football via helicopter from London City Airport. Messi was expected to come on as a substitute in a match with amateurs, as part of a publicity stunt by Adidas. However the exhibition event was cancelled due to security fears, after being surrounded by fans just moments after stepping out of the helicopter.

21st century: the diversity of the clubs
In the 1950s there were various Sunday teams formed by Irish or Italian immigrants. With the turn of the century the scene has changed. Several new clubs reflect different ethnic backgrounds such as Ukrainian, Bulgarian, Romanian, Ghanaian, Arabic, Nigerian, Turkish, Caribbean, Brazilian and others. Most of these ethnic teams consist of football players who had previously competed in semi-professional or even professional leagues in their countries before migrating to England. A great example is F.C. Romania a Sunday club that switched to Saturday football and currently plays in the Isthmian League.

Structure
Most of the Sunday leagues have named their first tier as the Premier Division while the Division One was previously considered the top level. Some leagues had even 10 divisions overall in the past (like the Wolverhampton & District in the 1950), while most of them they had up to 8. In the recent years 5 divisions is the most common number, though some  Sunday leagues consist of just 2. All the divisions are bound together by the principle of promotion and relegation. A certain number of the most successful clubs in each division can rise to a higher division, whilst those that finish the season at the bottom of their league can find themselves sinking down a level.The Sunday leagues  are not officially part of the English football league system, but are recognised at various levels by county football associations. They are eligible to enter County Sunday cup competitions (league cups, cups, charity cups etc.) and the FA Sunday Cup. Sunday clubs may, if they feel they meet the appropriate standard of play and have suitable facilities, apply to join a Saturday league and join the National League.

Finances and costs
Sunday league football has been financially supported to a certain extent by pubs and working men's clubs throughout its long history. But in recent years most clubs are either self-funded with their players contributing to the running costs or partially funded by various sponsors, though there are still quite a few pub clubs. The expenditure per season varies from £1,800 to £2,500, depending on the living standards of each area. The costs could include league affiliation (around £160), insurance and registration fees, pitch fees (up to £500 a year), kit and equipment costs (at least £350), also nets-corner flags-balls (around £200), referee fees (£250 and £500 per year payable by the home team) and fines. The increase of those costs resulted into the demise of many clubs which has drastically brought down the total number of Sunday teams registered in the local counties.  A 2015 study commissioned by the FA revealed that 2,360 grassroots football teams had folded in a three year period between 2012 and 2015.

Sunday Leagues by County Association
London Football Association

Camden Sunday League (1947) - 2 divisions (formerly 8 divisions)
Central London Super Sunday League (2008)
East London Sunday League (1930)
Ford Sunday League
Hackney and Leyton Sunday League (1947)
Inner London League (2001)
London and Kent Border Football League
Metropolitan Sunday League (1934)
North London Sunday League (1985)
Southern Sunday League (1944)
Sportsman's Senior Sunday League (1949)
Wandsworth and District Sunday League (1949)
West Fulham Sunday League (1936)
Woolwich and Eltham Sunday Football Alliance (2006)

Bedfordshire County Football Association

Bedford and District Sunday League
North Home Counties Sunday League
Leighton and District Sunday League
South Beds Sunday League

Berks & Bucks Football Association

No league, just Sunday Intermediate Cup and Junior cups

Birmingham County Football Association

 Beacon Sunday League (1977)
 Burton & District Sunday League (1964)
 Coventry & District Intermediate Sunday League (1966)
 Coventry & District Premier Sunday League (1966)
 Coventry & District Senior Sunday League (1962) 
 Leamington & Dist Sunday League (1966)
 Nuneaton & District Sunday League (1966) 
 Rugby & District Sunday League  
 Solihull & District Oakbourne Sunday League
 South Birmingham Sunday League & Sunday Premier League (1957) 
 Sutton & District Sunday Football League (1966)
 Tamworth & District Sunday League 
 Warley Sunday League 
 Wolverhampton & District Sunday League (1958) - 7 divisions (formerly 10 divisions)

Cambridgeshire County Football Association

Cambridge & District League

Cornwall County Football Association

Cornwall Sunday League
West Cornwall Sunday League

Cumberland Football Association

Carlisle City Sunday League

Derbyshire County Football Association

Alfreton and District Sunday League	
Chesterfield and District Sunday League (1966) 
Derby City League - Sunday Morning
Derby Taverners Sunday League (1963) 
Long Eaton Sunday League (1970)

Devon County Football Association

Exeter and District Sunday League
Torbay Sunday League
North Devon Sunday League
Plymouth and West Devon Sunday League
Devon Wednesday League

Dorset County Football Association

Bournemouth Hayward Sunday League
Blackmore Vale Football League
Weymouth Sunday League

Durham County Football Association

Consett and District Sunday League
Durham and District Sunday League
Darlington Sunday Morning Invitation League
Hartlepool Sunday League
Peterlee and District Sunday League
Spennymoor Sunday League
Stockton Sunday League
Sunderland Sunday League
Wear Valley Sunday League

East Riding County Football Association

Hull Sunday League

Essex County Football Association

Braintree & North Essex Sunday League
Brentwood Sunday League
Chelmsford Sunday League
Colchester & District Sunday League
Dagenham & District Sunday League
Essex Sunday Corinthian League - 7 divisions
Essex Sunday Football Combination
Harlow & District Sunday League
Romford & District Churches League
Sceptre Sunday League
South Essex Sunday League
Southend Borough Combination Veterans League
Southend and Basildon Sunday League
Thurrock Association Sunday League

Gloucestershire County Football Association

Bristol & District Sunday League (1966)
Bristol & Wessex Sunday League (1980)
Bristol Regional League (Sunday) (1963)
Cheltenham Sunday League (1968) - 5 divisions
Gloucester & District Sunday League (1965)

Hampshire Football Association

Basingstoke & District Sunday League

Herefordshire County Football Association

Herefordshire Sunday League

Hertfordshire County Football Association

Barnet Sunday League (1966)
Berkhamsted Sunday League
East Herts Corinthian League (1993)
Hitchin Sunday League (1977)
North London and South Herts League (1985)
Olympian Sunday League – Watford (1972)
Review Sunday League
North West Essex Sunday League
Stevenage Sunday League
Waltham (Sunday) League
Watford Sunday League
Welwyn Hatfield Sunday League

Huntingdonshire Football Association

Huntingdonshire Sunday League

Kent County Football Association

Ashford and District Sunday League
Dover Sunday League
Herne Bay and Whitstable Sunday League
Maidstone and Mid Kent Sunday League
Medway Messenger Sunday League
North Kent Sunday League
Orpington and Bromley District Sunday League
Sheppey Sunday League
Thanet Sunday League
West Kent Sunday League

Lancashire County Football Association

Blackburn Sunday League
Blackpool and Fylde Sunday Alliance
Burnley and District Sunday League
Bury and District Sunday League
Chorley Nissan Sunday League
Harry Dewhurst Memorial Sunday League
Middleton and District Sunday League
Lancashire Evening Post Sunday League
Ormskirk and District Sunday League
Pendle Charity League
Skelmersdale and District Sunday League
South Lancashire Counties League

Leicestershire and Rutland County Football Association

Alliance Football League
Charnwood Sunday Football League
Hinckley & District Football League
Leicester Sunday Football League
Melton & District Sunday Football League

Lincolnshire Football Association

Boston and District Sunday League 
Grantham & District Sunday League
Grimsby Cleethorpes and District Sunday League
Grimsby Intermediate League (Sunday)
Lincoln and District Sunday League  
Scunthorpe and District Sunday League  
Spalding and District Sunday League

Liverpool County Football Association

Birkenhead Sunday League
Crosby and District Sunday League
Ellesmere Port Senior Sunday League
Formers League – Sunday Competition
Liverpool Business Houses League – Sunday Competition
Ormskirk and District Sunday League
Skelmersdale and District Sunday League
Southport and District League – Sunday Competition
Wallasey and District Sunday League
Wirral Sunday League

London FA

Camden Sunday League (1948)
Central London Super Sunday League (2008)
East London Sunday League (1930)
Ford Sunday League
Hackney and Leyton Sunday League (1947) - 5 divisions
Inner London League (2001)
London and Kent Border Football League
London City Airport Sunday League
Metropolitan Sunday League (1934)
North London Sunday League (1985)
Southern Sunday League (1944)
Sportsman's Senior Sunday League (1949)
Wandsworth and District Sunday League (1949)
West Fulham Sunday League (1936)
Woolwich and Eltham Sunday Football Alliance (2006)

Manchester Football Association

Cheshire and Manchester Sunday League (1971)
Eccles Sunday League (1969)
Hyde & District Sunday League (1968)
Manchester Accountants Sunday League
Manchester Amateur Sunday League (1947)
Middleton and District Sunday League (1959)
Oldham Sunday Football League (1970)
Stockport and Cheadle Sunday League
Tameside Sunday League (1965)

Middlesex County Football Association

Middlesex County Sunday League

Norfolk County Football Association

Great Yarmouth Sunday League
King's Lynn and District Sunday League
Norwich and District Sunday League

North Riding County Football Association

Langbaurgh Sunday League - 3 Divisions
MB Distribution Redcar Sunday League - 2 Divisions
Ian's Cars of Barlby York Sunday Morning League - 4 Divisions
Scarborough and District Sunday League - 3 Divisions
Teesborough Football League - 2 Divisions
Black Sheep Brewery Hambleton Football Combination - 3 Divisions

Northamptonshire Football Association

Daventry & District Sunday League
Kettering Area Sunday League
Northants Sunday Combination
Northants Sunday Conference
Peterborough & District Sunday League]
Peterborough Sunday Morning League
Rushden & District Sunday League

Northumberland Football Association

Blyth and Wansbeck Sunday League
Cramlington and District Sunday League
Hexham and District Sunday League
Morpeth Sunday League
Newcastle Central Sunday Afternoon League
North East Sunday League

Nottinghamshire County Football Association

Nottinghamshire Sunday League

Oxfordshire County Football Association

Upper Thames Valley Sunday Football League (1980 - Present)

Sheffield & Hallamshire County Football Association

Sheffield Sunday League

Shropshire Football Association

Greenhous Shrewbury and District Sunday League

Somerset County Football Association

Bath and District Football League
Blackmore Vale Football League (1914) – Sunday
Bridgwater & District Sunday Football League (1966)
Frome & District Sunday Football League (1968)
Taunton & District Sunday Football League
Weston-Super-Mare Sunday Football League
Yeovil Sunday Football League (1975)

South Derbyshire Football Association

Burton and District Sunday Football League

Staffordshire Football Association

Stafford and District Sunday Football League

Suffolk County Football Association

Bury and District Sunday Football League
Ipswich and District Licensed Trades League
Ipswich Sunday League
Lowestoft Sunday League
Sudbury and District Sunday League

Surrey County Football Association

Surrey Sunday League

Sussex County Football Association

SSFL Sussex Sunday League

West Riding County Football Association

Bradford Sunday Alliance League
Bridge Balti Halifax Sunday Football League
Castleford & District Sunday League
Claro Sunday League
Goole & District Sunday League
Heavy Woollen Sunday League
Kirklees Sunday League
Leeds Combination League
Leeds Sunday Alliance Football League
Leeds Sunday Leagues
Wakefield & District Sunday League
Wharfedale Triangle League

Wiltshire Football Association

Wiltshire Sunday League

Worcestershire County Football Association

Worcestershire Sunday League

Sunday League records
In March 2012, Wheel Power F.C. won 58–0 against Nova 2010 F.C. in the Torbay Sunday League to record what was believed to be the largest victory ever achieved in British football.
On 4 May 2013, Alex Torr scored a hat-trick in world record-breaking 70 seconds in the Rawson Springs - Winn Gardens (7-1), in the Meadowhall Sunday League of Sheffield. Match referee Matt Tyers has confirmed the timings of the goals and admitted he had never seen anything like it before. Torr just three days earlier had notched another treble in just three in a 7-0 win over Penistone Church.

Notable clubs
Forest Gate Mount Athletic - won 3 Sunday Cups (1962, 1963, 1964)
New Salamis - played in 2 Sunday Cup Finals (2015, 2016) and afterwards switched to Saturday football, playing currently in the Spartan South Midlands League 
Senrab F.C. - produced more than 170 professional players and still compete in the Essex Corinthian League
Albion Sports - won 5 championships in the Bradford Sunday League (2000, 2001, 2003, 2005, 2006), played in 2 Sunday Cup Finals (2000, 2005) and afterwards switched to Saturday football, playing currently in the Northern Counties East League 
F.C. Romania - switched to Saturday football, playing currently in the Isthmian League
Walthamstow Avenue F.C. - the oldest club (founded in 1900), won the FA Amateur Cup and the Isthmian Football League 3 times each, before joining the English Sunday League 
Stannington Village - won 6 championships in the Sheffield Sunday League (2004, 2013, 2014, 2015, 2017, 2018)
Sheffield Trades & Labour - won 4 championships in the Sheffield Sunday League (1989, 1990, 1991, 1992)
Woodhouse George/West End - won 7 championships in the Sheffield Sunday League (1995, 2005, 2006, 2007, 2008, 2009, 2010)
Hetton Lions Cricket Club - won a record 4 Sunday Cups (2006, 2008, 2010, 2012)
Carlton United - played in 3 Sunday Cup Finals (1967, 1973,1979), currently playing in the Lowestoft Sunday League
Penn Old boys - one of the longest operating Sunday club, founded in 1958 by 16 year-olds and played in the Wolverhampton & District Sunday League  for 40 years until 1998.
Imperial - won a record 7 championships in the Barnet Sunday League 
Marshtons Sports FC - won a record 5 championships in the Wolverhampton & District (1990, 1991, 1994, 1995, 1996) and played in 3 Sunday Cup Finals (1990, 1992, 1997)
Riverside - won 13 championships in the Watford Sunday League (1956, 1957, 1960,  1961, 1962, 1963, 1964, 1966, 1967, 1968, 1970, 1972, 1973)
Oakview - won a record 14 championships in the Watford Sunday League (1996, 1997, 1998, 1999, 2003, 2006, 2008, 2009, 2011, 2012, 2014, 2015, 2016, 2017) 
Evergreen - won 9 championships in the Watford Sunday League (1974, 1975, 1976, 1977, 1978, 1979, 1981, 1992, 1993) and played in the 1976 Sunday Cup Final
Luton St.Josephs - won 10 championships in the Watford Sunday League (1982, 1983, 1986, 1989, 2000, 2001, 2004, 2005, 2007, 2010) and played in 6 Sunday Cup Finals (1995, 1996, 1998, 1999, 2006, 2020)
Monica Star FC - the only Sunday team that has fielded 4 ex-Premier League players in their squad: Lee Hendrie, Paul Devlin, Darren Byfield and Lee Carsley
South East Dons - arguably the most popular Sunday club worldwide with more than 175,000 social media subscribers and international jersey sales. They play in the Orpington & Bromley District League 
Birstall Stamford Fc - the most successful team in Sunday league history winning 83 trophy’s domestically with also getting to 4 semi finals and a final (2019) in the Sunday FA cup. They play in the Leicestershire and Charnwood Sunday league.

Notable players
Many players with professional experience before or after joining the league have played for Sunday League clubs. Some of them they were also ex-internationals.

Junior and minor
 Lee Bowyer - Essex Corinthian Sunday League
 David Beckham - Hackney and Leyton Sunday League
 Sol Campbell - Hackney and Leyton Sunday League
 Jermain Defoe - Essex Corinthian Sunday League
 Ugo Ehiogu -  Essex Corinthian Sunday League
 Rio Ferdinand - Hackney and Leyton Sunday League
 Bedford Jezzard - Hackney and Leyton Sunday League
 Jimmy Greaves - Hackney and Leyton Sunday League 
 Bobby Moore - Hackney and Leyton Sunday League
 Ledley King - Essex Corinthian Sunday League] 
 Stuart Pearce - Hackney and Leyton Sunday League 
 John Terry - Essex Corinthian Sunday League
 Shaun Wright-Phillips - Orpington and Bromley District Sunday League
 Bobby Zamora - Essex Corinthian Sunday League
 Cliff Akurang -  Essex Corinthian Sunday League
 Ade Akinbiyi - Essex Corinthian Sunday League
 Jlloyd Samuel - Essex Corinthian Sunday League
 Simon Ford - Essex Corinthian Sunday League
 Muzzy Izzet - Essex Corinthian Sunday League

Youth
 Stuart Pearce - Fulham and District Sunday League (1978–81)
 Alex Torr - Meadowhall Sunday League
 Ian Wright - Orpington and Bromley District Sunday League (until 1984)

During professional career
Jimmy Mullen - Wolverhampton & District Sunday League
Zak Ansah - Orpington & Bromley District Sunday League (2019-present)

Post-career
 Darren Byfield - Central Warwickshire (2017–present)
 Paul Gascoigne - Bournemouth Sunday League (2014–15)
 Tony Hibbert - Skelmersdale Sunday league (2016–18)
 Nile Ranger - Barnet Sunday League (2020–present)
 Liam Ridgewell - Sutton and District Sunday League (2020–present)
 Robbie Savage - Wrexham Sunday League (2013–14)
 Chris Waddle - Lincoln and District Sunday League (2019–present)
 Lee Carsley - Central Warwickshire (2017–present)
 Lee Hendrie - Central Warwickshire (2017–present)
 Paul Devlin - Central Warwickshire (2017–18)
 Julio Arca - Sunderland Sunday League (2014–15)
 Martin Petrov -Central Warwickshire
 Stiliyan Petrov - Central Warwickshire (2014–15)
 Ntinos Pontikas - Hackney and Leyton Sunday League (2021–present)
 Ricardo Fuller - Potteries and District Sunday League (2018–19)

Notable managers
 David Busst - Central Warwickshire
 Lee Bowyer - Essex Corinthian Sunday League 
 Ray Lewington - Essex Corinthian Sunday League 
 Kevin Nolan Sr. - Liverpool and District Sunday League
 Chris Wilder - Imperial and Meadowhall Sunday League
 Ray Wilkins - Essex Corinthian Sunday League 
 Dario Gradi - Essex Corinthian Sunday League

References

External links

League football
Non-League football
Football leagues in England